Charkiyeh (or Charqiyeh (Arabic: الشرقية) ) is a village in the Nabatieh Governorate region of southern Lebanon, located just north of Doueir. Charkiyeh was first settled by the family Cheaib whose members escaped systemic persecution in Eastern Lebanon back in 1574 AD by their enemies, the Houbaiches, Assafs and Saifas. Ranking members of the Cheaib’s and their families fled to different parts of Lebanon, Syria, Turkey, Israel, and Egypt where they currently reside. Many are well known especially in Nabatieh Governorate (Arabic: محافظة النبطية),  in South Lebanon. The Cheaib's trace their family roots to the ancient city of Arqa (Arabic: عرقة) in the North governorate. They also trace their ancestry to the Midianite Nabi (Prophet) Shuaib. In the Hebrew Bible, Jethro (biblical figure)(/ˈdʒɛθroʊ/; Hebrew: יִתְרוֹ‎, Standard: Yitro, Tiberian: Yiṯerô, meaning "His Excellence/Posterity"; Arabic: شعيب‎, romanized: Shuʿayb) was Moses' father-in-law, a Kenite shepherd and priest of Midian.

External links
Charqiyeh, Localiban

Populated places in Nabatieh District